is a professional Japanese baseball player. He plays pitcher for the Fukuoka SoftBank Hawks after being drafted in 2016.

Early baseball career
Tanaka was selected to the Japan national baseball team for 2014 Haarlem Baseball Week and Baseball at the 2015 Summer Universiade while attending Sōka University.

Professional career
On October 20, 2016, Tanaka was drafted by the Fukuoka Softbank Hawks first overall pick in the 2016 Nippon Professional Baseball draft.

In 2017 season, Tanaka played in the Western League of NPB's minor leagues and played in informal matches against Shikoku Island League Plus's teams.

On April 1, 2018, Tanaka pitched his debut game against the Orix Buffaloes as a relief pitcher. In 2018 season, he pitched in 10 games.

In 2019 season, Tanaka hurt his right shoulder in spring training and spent 4 months in rehabilitation. And he pitched only one game.

In 2020 season, Tanaka hurt his right elbow in spring training and spent the season in rehabilitation. As a result, he had no chance to pitch in the Pacific League.

On June 27, 2021, Tanaka pitched in the Pacific League for the first time in two years against the Tohoku Rakuten Golden Eagles. In 2021 season, he finished the regular season with a 18 Games pitched, a 0–0 Win–loss record, a 2.16 ERA,  a one Holds, and a 14 strikeouts in 16.2 innings.

In 2022 season, he injured his right shoulder in the preseason game on March 20, and the effect delayed his start in the Pacific League on August 14. 
He finished the regular season with a 5 Games pitched, a 0–0 Win–loss record, a 0.00 ERA,  a one Holds, and a 6 strikeouts in 5 innings.

References

External links

 Career statistics - NPB.jp
25 Seigi Tanaka PLAYERS2022 - Fukuoka SoftBank Hawks Official site
 Japan Times

1994 births
Living people
Baseball people from Yokohama
Nippon Professional Baseball pitchers
Fukuoka SoftBank Hawks players
Universiade gold medalists for Japan
Japanese expatriate baseball players in Puerto Rico
Gigantes de Carolina players
Hokkaido Nippon-Ham Fighters players